Negatron is the eighth studio album by Canadian heavy metal band Voivod, released on November 21, 1995 through Hypnotic Records worldwide and Mausoleum Records in the US. It is the first studio album not to feature original singer Denis "Snake" Bélanger, who temporarily left the band in 1994, with bass player Eric Forrest assuming vocal duties for the recording. The album also features Foetus frontman JG Thirlwell as a guest vocalist on the final track "D.N.A. (Don't No Anything)".

Album information
The album is considered a departure from Voivod's previous progressive metal style, with the band adopting elements of industrial metal while "they pollute their avant-garde punk metal" and death metal growls within a heavy metal framework.

The CD release is notable for including multimedia tracks in CD-ROM format, which was a novelty at the time.

Track listing
All music by Voivod. All lyrics by Michel Langevin and Eric Forrest, except where indicated.

 A limited edition of 750 copies was available with the same track listing. This limited edition came in a tin box with a Negatron sticker.

Personnel
Voivod
Eric Forrest - vocals, bass guitar
Denis D'Amour - guitars, effects 
Michel Langevin - drums, percussion, artwork

Additional musicians
JG Thirlwell - vocals & FX on "D.N.A. (Don't No Anything)"

Production
Daryn Barry, Alfio Annibalini - producers, engineers, mixing
Bruce Longman, Michael Zarich - assistant engineers
Rob Fischer, Joe Melo - digital editing
Eddy Schreyer - mastering

References

1995 albums
Voivod (band) albums
Mausoleum Records albums